Simeonov is a Bulgarian masculine surname, its feminine counterpart is Simeonova or Simionova. It may refer to
Albena Simeonova (born 1964), Bulgarian environmental activist
Aleksandar Simeonov (disambiguation) 
Dimitar Simeonov (born 1987), Bulgarian football player
Filipa Simeonova (born 1991), Bulgarian rhythmic gymnast
Ivan Simeonov (born 1926), Bulgarian sprint canoer 
Kaspar Simeonov (born 1955), Bulgarian volleyball player
Mihail Simeonov (born 1929), Bulgarian artist 
Nikola Simeonov (born 1939), Bulgarian Olympic marathon runner
Simeon Simeonov (disambiguation) 
Svetlin Simeonov (born 1975), Bulgarian football midfielder
Svilen Simeonov (born 1974), Bulgarian football player
Todor Simeonov (born 1976), Bulgarian football player
Valeri Simeonov (born 1955), Bulgarian politician 
Venceslav Simeonov (born 1977), Bulgarian-Italian volleyball player
Zdravko Simeonov (born 1946), Bulgarian Olympic volleyball player
Gheorghe Simionov (born 1950), Romanian sprint canoer
Toma Simionov (born 1955), Romanian sprint canoer, brother of Gheorghe

See also
Simonov

Bulgarian-language surnames
Patronymic surnames
Surnames from given names